Violin Sonata No. 22 in A major (K. 305/293d) is a work composed by Wolfgang Amadeus Mozart in Mannheim in 1778.  There are two movements:

The first movement is in sonata form.  This movement has one of the bounciest, happiest melodies to be found in his violin sonatas.  The second movement is in a theme and variations form.  This movement is more somber than the opening movement, being at a slower tempo and having a more subdued melody.

Notes

References
 contains score and both parts

305
1778 compositions
Compositions in A major